St Luke's Church is in the village of Dunham on the Hill, Cheshire, England.  It is an active Anglican parish church in the deanery of Frodsham, the archdeaconry of Chester, and the diocese of Chester.  Its benefice is combined with that of St Paul, Helsby.  The church is recorded in the National Heritage List for England as a designated Grade II listed building.

History

The foundation stone of the church was laid on 22 May 1860.  The church was designed by James Harrison.  It was consecrated on 18 October 1861, and was originally a chapel of ease in the parish of St Mary, Thornton-le-Moors.  The estimated cost was £800 (equivalent to £ in ).

Architecture

St Luke's is constructed in sandstone with a slate roof.  The architectural style is that of the early 14th century.  Its plan consists of a three-bay nave with a south porch, and a chancel with north and south vestries.  At the west end is a bellcote.  The windows along the sides of the nave have two lights, the east window has three, and the west window four lights.  Inside the porch are three niches.  There are stone cross finials at the east ends of the nave and the chancel.

Inside the church is a wooden screen with linenfold panelling.  The stone font is dated 1863, and consists of an octagonal bowl on an octagonal pedestal.  The wooden pulpit is also octagonal.  In the church is an elaborate hanging gilt cross that was moved here from Chester Cathedral in 1921.  It was designed by George Gilbert Scott and made by Skidmore of Coventry.  The stained glass in the east window, dating from about 1878, was made by Shrigley and Hunt and designed by Carl Almquist.

See also

Listed buildings in Dunham on the Hill

References

External links
Church website

Church of England church buildings in Cheshire
Grade II listed churches in Cheshire
Churches completed in 1861
19th-century Church of England church buildings
Diocese of Chester
1861 establishments in England